Elaeocarpus obtusus is a species of flowering plant in the Elaeocarpaceae family. It is native to Southeast Asia.

References

obtusus
Flora of Malesia
Flora of Thailand
Flora of Vietnam
Taxa named by Carl Ludwig Blume
Plants described in 1823